The Council on Quality and Leadership (CQL) is an organization in the United States concerned with the definition, measurement, and improvement of personal and community quality of life for people with disabilities, mental illness, and substance abuse disorder. It was founded in 1969 by national advocacy and professional organizations in various fields.

Today, CQL operates an international accreditation program, provides consultation and technical assistance for quality improvement, conducts research and disseminates knowledge, and promotes the definition of quality of life within the context of community life.

CQL member organizations form the governing body by appointing representatives to serve on the board of directors. They include the American Association on Intellectual and Developmental Disabilities (AAIDD), American Network of Community Options and Resources (ANCOR), Autism Society of America, Mosaic, the National Association of QMRPs (NAQ), National Alliance for Direct Support Professionals (NADSP), Self Advocates Becoming Empowered (SABE), and The Arc. It has partnerships with organisations in Canada and the Republic of Ireland.

History 
CQL evolved from the work of the American Association on Mental Deficiency-AAMD (now American Association on Intellectual and Developmental Disabilities-AAIDD). In 1952, AAMD published the report of a special committee on standards for institutions serving people with intellectual disability. With funding from the National Institute of Mental Health-NIMH, AAMD undertook a major standards development project, culminating in the publication of the Standards for State Institutions for the Mentally Retarded in 1964. In 1966, AAMD and the National Association for Retarded Citizens (now The Arc), the Council for Exceptional Children (CEC) and United Cerebral Palsy (UCP) formed the National Planning Committee on Accreditation of Residential Centers for the Retarded. In 1969 the Joint Commissionon Accreditation of Hospitals invited the National Planning Committee to establish an accreditation council within its structure.

The Accreditation Council for Facilities for the Mentally Retarded (ACFMR) developed accreditation standards and conducted accreditation reviews of facilities serving people with intellectual disability over the next ten years. In 1979 the Joint Commission reorganized its administrative structure and terminated its agreements with various accreditation councils, replacing them with professional and technical advisory committees. The ACFMR voted to reorganize as an independent, not-for-profit organization – to be known as The Accreditation Council for Services for Mentally Retarded and Other Developmentally Disabled Persons-ACMRDD. Founding members of ACMRDD were: AAMD (now AAIDD), American Psychological Association, The Arc, Epilepsy Foundation of America, National Association of Private Residential Facilities (now ANCOR), National Association of Social Workers, National Society for Children and Adults with Autism (now Autism Society of America), and UCP. In 1981 the American Occupational Therapy Association and the Council for Exceptional Children also became sponsoring organizations. ACMRDD's work in updating the standards and review methodology was initially supported by the Administration on Developmental Disabilities in the U.S. Department of Health and Human Services.

During the 1980s and 1990s, the name of the organization evolved from ACMRDD to The Accreditation Council on Services for People with Disabilities-ACD, and in 1997 it became The Council on Quality and Leadership-CQL.

During the 1980s, CQL published new editions of standards and conducted a national accreditation program for organizations providing services to people with disabilities. CQL's design and dissemination of habilitation standards emphasized the interdisciplinary team process, individualized program planning, behavior intervention, and the promotion of disability rights. The Standards for Services influenced federal certification requirements for the Intermediate Care Facilities for intellectual disability (ICF/MR) program. The Health Care Financing Administration-HCFA, now the Centers for Medicare and Medicaid Services-CMS, acknowledged that its regulations were based on the 1983 draft CQL standards.

CQL standards were also recognized by the U.S. courts in several landmark cases, including:
 Wyatt v Stickney (State of Alabama, 1972)
 Evans v Washington (District of Columbia, 1978)
 The Arc v Schafer (State of North Dakota, 1982)
 Lelsz v Kavanagh (State of Texas, 1987)
 Baldridge v Clinton (State of Arkansas, 1991)
The courts affirmed that CQL standards represented a reliable benchmark for ensuring that individuals with disabilities were receiving appropriate services and that their rights, safety, and security were assured.

During this period, CQL operated as a standards organization and accreditation organization, with a particular focus on quality in services for people with intellectual disability and other developmental disabilities.

In the 1990s, CQL shifted to a broader focus, moving beyond habilitation planning and measures of organizational process. Work began on the Outcome Based Performance Measures, renamed Personal Outcome Measures in 2000. These new measures were a departure from previous editions of standards and redefined quality in services in terms of an organization's capability to facilitate outcomes for people.

CQL used the term "personal outcomes" in contrast to "process outcomes". Process outcomes are concerned with an organization's compliance with norms or regulations. They measure organizational accomplishments, such as number of placements, hours of service delivery, staffing ratios, or number of people served in a program. Personal outcomes focus on the issues that matter most to the person receiving the services provided by the organization. They answer the question of "how well did the organization deliver its services to meet the individual needs and desires of each person?" The CQL accreditation process with the Personal Outcome Measures is built around interviews with people receiving services and learning how each person defines the outcomes for him or herself. From this understanding of what each individual wants, the organization is evaluated on how well it delivered person centered services and support. The Personal Outcome Measures apply to people with mental illness, children, youth and families, and other at risk or vulnerable people in the human service system.

In 2005, CQL published Quality Measures 2005> emphasizing Community Life as the context for quality.

In the Fall of 2010, CQL published the Guide to Person-centered Excellence as the culmination of the What Really Matters Initiative. CQL developed the Guide to Person-centered Excellence to encourage organizations to provide the supports and services for people that really matter. The Guide utilizes CQL's 8 Key Factors and 34 Success Indicators that promote personal quality of life. CQL developed three different applications, one for each setting: services and supports for older adults, people with mental illness, and people with intellectual and developmental disabilities. The 34 Success Indicators are consistent across all three settings, while the narratives are tailored to apply to the specific audience and service setting.

CQL continues to place the Personal Outcome Measures® at the foundation of work with organizations. One-to-one conversations with people receiving supports are the most powerful source of knowledge and understanding when it comes to defining excellence and person-centeredness.

 Defining "quality" 
 1970s and 1980s – Compliance Standards for Services 
CQL originated in the late 1960s in an effort to stop the abuses and inhumane treatment in large public institutions serving people with intellectual disabilities. Quality of care or quality of service was defined in terms of organizational processes, with particular emphases on assuring safety, health, and security. During the 1970s and 1980s, CQL developed national consensus standards for organizations providing services to people with intellectual disabilities. The standards reflected the principles and values of professionals, families, provider organizations, and government agencies. CQL standards were published in 1971, 1973, 1978, 1981, 1985, 1987 and 1990.

In the early stages of this period, quality in human services focused primarily on the organizations that housed people with disabilities. Over time, the focus shifted to the individuals who were cared for by these organizations. Definitions of quality addressed internal processes necessary to ensure that the service recipient received adequate and appropriate care or treatment. However, the focus remained on program evaluation as the measure of quality.

 1990s – Personal Outcome Measures® 
CQL shifted the definition of quality from compliance with program or process standards to responsiveness to people. Work on the Personal Outcome Measures® began in 1991, as CQL held focus group meetings with people with disabilities and their families. People defined the outcomes that were most important to them. CQL introduced the Outcome Based Performance Measures in 1993 and the modified Personal Outcome Measures in 1997.

These measures represented a significant departure from traditional quality systems. CQL shifted the focus to measuring individual quality of life. Not only were the measures different, the process of gathering information also changed. Personal interviews with people with intellectual disabilities, people with mental illness, or people with other conditions are the foundation of the data gathering process. The measures are applied and evaluated based on the unique characteristics, needs, and desires of each individual.

 2000s – Social Capital and Community Life 
At the start of the new century, and after ten years of data gathering and analysis, CQL recognized that personal outcomes are most likely to be realized when people are part of communities of concerned and supporting people. CQL once again shifted its definitions of quality by focusing on the social or community context for the attainment of personal quality of life. The individual focus of person-directed outcomes, self-determination and individual choice requires a social context. The challenge for organizations and support groups is not only to engage in person-directed processes; rather, it is to use the person-directed orientation to build social capital and community connections.

CQL's Quality Measures 2005'' is a comprehensive resource on multiple dimensions of quality assessment and enhancement. It builds on the foundations of past standards and moves human service providers forward into the current environment.

2010s - Person-centered Excellence 
More than fifteen years of research on the CQL Personal Outcome Measure® national database revealed the importance of person-centered services and social networks in facilitating personal quality of life outcomes for people. CQL introduced the dialogue on social capital and disability in 2000, and redefined quality within the context of community inclusion. CQL argued that people find meaningful life opportunities and alternatives outside of programs and organizational services. The role of organizations is to connect people with resources and social networks in their communities. Unfortunately, our data and experience indicate that many organizations have difficulty making these connections.

This led CQL to embark on the development of new definitions, metrics and improvement methods focused on person-centered supports through the What Really Matters initiative. Over a 12-month period, CQL sought out the best thinkers and innovators across a wide range of human services to guide our work.

Activities 
CQL works with public and private organizations to improve the quality of services and support provided to people with disabilities and people with mental illness. CQL provides services including accreditation, training, certification, research, consultation, and tools and resources.

References 
Schalock, R.L., Gardner, J.F. and Bradley, V.J. (2007). Quality of Life for Persons with Intellectual and Other Developmental Disabilities: Applications across Individuals, Organizations, Communities, and Systems. Washington, DC: AAIDD.
Gardner, J.F. & Carran, D.T. (2005). "The Attainment of Personal Outcomes by People with Developmental Disabilities." Mental Retardation. 43(3), 157–173.
Gardner, J.F. (2002). "The Evolving Social Context for Quality in Services and Supports for People with Disabilities." In D. Croser, R. Schalock & P. Baker (Eds.), Embarking on a New Century: Mental Retardation at the End of the 20th Century. Washington, DC: AAMR.
Gardner, J.F., Carran, D.T., & Nudler, S. (2001). "Measuring Quality of Life and Quality of Services through Personal Outcome Measures: Implications for Public Policy." International Review of Research in Mental Retardation, Vol. 24, pp 75–100.
Gardner, J.F., Nudler, S., & Chapman, M. (1997) "Personal Outcomes as Measures of Quality." Mental Retardation, 35:4 (August), 295–305.
Gardner, J.F., & Campanella, T. (1997) "Challenging Traditions: Measuring Quality as Outcomes for People." In K. Jacobs & J. Pratt (Eds.). Work Practice: International Perspectives. Oxford, UK: Butterworth Heinemann, Reed Educational and Professional Publishing, Ltd.
Gardner, J.F. & Nudler, S. (1997). "Beyond Compliance to Responsiveness: Accreditation Reconsidered." In R.L. Schalock (Ed.), Quality of Life Volume 11: Application to Persons with Disabilities. Washington, DC: AAMR.
Gardner, J.F. & Campanella, T. (1995). "Beyond Compliance to Responsiveness: New Measures of Quality for Accreditation," Work: A Journal of Prevention, Assessment and Rehabilitation, V, 107–114.
Federal Register, June 3, 1988.

External links
CQL website

Disability organizations based in the United States
Disability rights organizations
Developmental disabilities
Non-profit organizations based in Maryland
Organizations established in 1969